Introspection is the self-observation of one's mental processes.

Introspection may also refer to:

Music
Introspection (EP), a 2013 EP by Keep of Kalessin
Introspection (Greg Howe album), 1993
Introspection (Myriads album), 2002
Introspection (Thijs van Leer album), or the title song, 1972
Introspection, a 1969 album by the UK band The End
Introspection, a 2006 album by Ivo Perelman
"Introspection", a song by MC Solaar from Mach 6
"Introspection", a song by MGMT from their 2013 eponymous album

Other uses
Type introspection, a capability of some object-oriented programming languages
Virtual machine introspection, a technique for externally monitoring the runtime state of a system-level virtual machine

See also
Introspection Rundown, a Scientology practice
Introspective, a 1988 album by Pet Shop Boys
Introspective (Amber Smith album), 2007